The blacktip shiner (Lythrurus atrapiculus) is a freshwater ray-finned fish in the family Cyprinidae, the carps and minnows. It is found in the southeastern United States, particularly the Apalachicola, Choctawhatchee, Yellow and Escambia river drainages in western Georgia, southeastern Alabama and Florida. Its preferred habitat is sandy and gravel bottomed pools and runs of headwaters, creeks and small rivers. The Blacktip shiner measures about 6.5 centimeters.

References

Lythrurus
Freshwater fish of the United States
Fish described in 1972